Francis Raymond Fahey (January 22, 1896 – March 19, 1954) was an American Major League Baseball outfielder and pitcher. He played for the Philadelphia Athletics during the  season.

References

Major League Baseball outfielders
Major League Baseball pitchers
Philadelphia Athletics players
Baseball players from Massachusetts
1896 births
1954 deaths
Catholic University Cardinals baseball players
Cleveland Indians scouts